McKeating is a surname. Notable people with the surname include:

Dan McKeating (1910–?), English rugby league player
Jane A. McKeating, British scientist
Vince McKeating (1919–2011), English rugby league player